Serine/threonine-protein phosphatase PP1-beta catalytic subunit is an enzyme that in humans is encoded by the PPP1CB gene.

The protein encoded by this gene is one of the three catalytic subunits of protein phosphatase 1 (PP1). PP1 is a serine/threonine specific protein phosphatase known to be involved in the regulation of a variety of cellular processes, such as cell division, glycogen metabolism, muscle contractility, protein synthesis, and HIV-1 viral transcription. Mouse studies suggest that PP1 functions as a suppressor of learning and memory. Two alternatively spliced transcript variants encoding distinct isoforms have been observed.

Interactions
PPP1CB has been shown to interact with PPP1R15A, Nucleolin, SMARCB1 and PPP1R9B.

References

Further reading